The first lady of the 36 states in Nigeria is the advisor to the governor and often plays a role in social activism. The position is traditionally held by the wife of the state governor. However, the administration of Mohammed Buhari, President of Nigeria since 2015, nullified the Office of the First Lady.

Lists of First Ladies of the 36 states in Nigeria prior to President Buhari's action

Former

Bolanle Ambode
Abimbola Fashola
Oluremi Tinubu
Mercy Odochi Orji
Judith Amaechi
Mary Odili
Rose A. George

References 

Nigeria politics-related lists
Lists of Nigerian people